Losing My Religion is a fiction novel by Indian author Vishwas Mudagal. This debut novel of Mudagal was published by FingerPrint! Publishing and released on 10 February 2014.

Plot
The story is about a young entrepreneur - Rishi Rai who goes bankrupt and sets off on an unplanned trip across India which soon turns into a journey of self-discovery, love and friendship.

Characters
 Rishi Rai, an Entrepreneur from Bangalore
 Alexander Long, a hippie from San Francisco 
 Kyra Blake, a New York girl
 Gerard Wolf, a New York based media mogul

References

Indian English-language novels
2014 Indian novels